Juan Manuel Martínez Martínez (born 26 September 1955), commonly known as Casuco, is a Spanish former football right back and manager.

Playing career
Born in Lorca, Region of Murcia, Casuco spent most of his career at Real Zaragoza, playing more than 320 competitive matches. In 1986, he won the Copa del Rey with his main club.

Casuco also represented Elche CF in La Liga, being relegated at the end of the 1977–78 season after starting in all his 27 appearances.

Coaching career
Casuco started working as a manager in 1994. At the professional level, he worked in Segunda División with CD Toledo, UD Almería, Real Murcia, CD Tenerife and Xerez CD.

Honours
Zaragoza
Copa del Rey: 1985–86

References

External links

Futbolme coach profile 
Biography at Región de Murcia 

1955 births
Living people
People from Lorca, Spain
Spanish footballers
Footballers from the Region of Murcia
Association football defenders
La Liga players
Segunda División players
Segunda División B players
Tercera División players
Granada CF footballers
Elche CF players
Real Zaragoza players
UD Alzira footballers
Spanish football managers
Segunda División managers
Segunda División B managers
Tercera División managers
CD Toledo managers
UD Almería managers
Real Murcia managers
CD Tenerife managers
Xerez CD managers
CD Castellón managers
Águilas FC managers